The "Pontifical Anthem and March", also known as the "Papal Anthem", is the anthem played to mark the presence of the Pope or one of his representatives, such as a nuncio, and on other solemn occasions. When the Vatican's flag is ceremonially raised, only the first eight bars are played.

While the Papal Anthem also serves as the national anthem of the Holy See and the Vatican City State, the Vatican stresses that it "is not to be understood as a national anthem"; it is a composition whose words and music "speak to the heart of many throughout the world who see in Rome the See of Peter."

History
The music was composed in 1869 by Charles Gounod, for the celebration on 11 April 1869 of Pope Pius IX's golden jubilee of priestly ordination. The purely instrumental piece in three parts, originally called "Marche pontificale" (French for "Pontifical March"), became extremely popular from its first performance. It was first performed that day at four o'clock in the afternoon with seven pontifical bands and a chorus of over one thousand soldiers.

On 16 October 1949, Pope Pius XII declared it the papal anthem, replacing Viktorin Hallmayer's "Marcia trionfale" (1857), which, being still the papal anthem when the Vatican City State was founded in 1929, had been treated also as the new state's anthem. Gounod's "Marche Pontificale" was first performed in this new role during a ceremony on Christmas Eve of 1949, one day before the opening of the Holy Year 1950. The old state anthem too was played for a last time, almost as a token of respect.

At that time, Antonio Allegra (1905–1969), who was then one of the organists of St. Peter's Basilica, wrote Italian lyrics for Gounod's music. Other lyrics have been composed for the music in various languages and by different authors. In 1991, Raffaello Lavagna of Savona (1918–2015) wrote Latin lyrics for a four-voice choir, on an arrangement by Alberico Vitalini.

Lyrics

Italian lyrics by Allegra (1949)

Latin lyrics by Lavagna (1991)

Alternative Latin lyrics

See also

 Index of Vatican City-related articles

Notes

References

Further reading
, info here

External links
 Official site of Vatican City State
 Streaming audio, lyrics and information about the Pontifical Anthem (archive link)

Royal anthems
Vatican City culture
Compositions by Charles Gounod
1869 compositions
European anthems
National anthems
Latin-language Christian hymns
National anthem compositions in F major